Altenbrenda Castle was is a lowland castle, now reduced to a burgstall, located in the Großer Garten, 1000 metres northeast of the present village of Unterweißenbrunn in the borough of Bischofsheim an der Rhön in the Lower Franconian county of Rhön-Grabfeld in Bavaria.

The burgstall is situated near the sewage works for Unterweißenbrunn, in an area that is known today as the abandoned village (Wüstung) of Altenbrenda.

Literature 
 Björn-Uwe Abels: Führer zu vor- und frühgeschichtlichen Denkmälern. Band 28: Bad Kissingen, Fränkische Saale, Grabfeld, Südliche Rhön. Verlag Philipp von Zabern, Mainz 1975, S. 99.
 Björn-Uwe Abels: Die vor- und frühgeschichtlichen Geländedenkmäler Unterfrankens. (Materialhefte zur bayerischen Vorgeschichte, Reihe B, Band 6). Verlag Michael Lassleben, Kallmünz 1979, S. 167.

External links 
 Mittelalterliche Wüstung „Altenbrenda“ 

Buildings and structures in Rhön-Grabfeld
Heritage sites in Bavaria
Rhön Mountains
Castles in Bavaria